The Modern Pentathlon Federation of India (MPFI) is the national governing body for the Olympic sport of modern pentathlon in India.

The MPFI was founded in 2009 by former Kabaddi player Namdev Shirgaonkar. The MPFI was recognized by the Indian Olympic Association (IOA) in 2012. The MPFI is affiliated to the Asian Modern Pentathlon Confederation (APMC) of the Union Internationale de Pentathlon Moderne (UIPM).

The MPFI signed an MoU with the Egyptian Modern Pentathlon Federation (EMPF) on 27 September 2016 at Karnal, Haryana. The MoU facilitates sharing and developing technical and IT support facilities between the two bodies, and also created an exchange programme for athletes and coaches of the two countries.

MPFI General Secretary Shirgaonkar was elected as the General Secretary of the APMC in the federation's elections in Kyrgyzstan on 19 October 2016. Shirgaonkar defeated South Korean Sankeong Yeo ending South Korea's control over the secretary position after 25 years.

Championships 
The MPFI held the 4th Modern Pentathlon National Championship in Goa in September 2013. The 8th Modern Pentathlon National Championship was held in Pune in August 2017.

References

Sports governing bodies in India
Modern pentathlon in Asia
2009 establishments in Maharashtra
Sports organizations established in 2009
Organisations based in Mumbai
National members of the Union Internationale de Pentathlon Moderne